The BFG is a 1989 British animated fantasy adventure film produced by Cosgrove Hall Films, based on the 1982 novel of the same name by Roald Dahl. It was directed by Brian Cosgrove and written by John Hambley. The film was first shown on 25 December 1989 on ITV in the United Kingdom.

The film was dedicated to animator George Jackson, who had worked on numerous Cosgrove Hall productions prior to his death in 1986. This film is also the last role of Ballard Berkeley (the voice of the Head of the Army), who died in 1988.

Plot
Sophie is a young orphaned girl living in the orphanage of the cantankerous and abusive Mrs. Clonkers. One night, Sophie wakes up and looks out of her window to see a cloaked Giant Man blowing something through a trumpet into a bedroom window down the street; whereupon the Giant Man notices her and snatches her through the window, carrying her away to a mysterious realm known as "Giant Country".

In his cave, the Giant identifies himself as the Big Friendly Giant (or BFG for short) who blows dreams into the bedrooms of children at night, while all the other nine giants are vicious, bestial child-eaters. Not wanting to eat or steal from humans, the BFG subsists on eating "snozzcumbers"; revolting vegetables, resembling cucumbers, which are all that grows in Giant Country. He explains that he took her so she couldn't tell anyone that she had seen him and start a giant hunt. Sophie and the BFG quickly become friends; but Sophie is soon put in danger when a gruesome giant known as the Bloodbottler intrudes and unknowingly comes dangerously close to eating her. After the Bloodbottler leaves, the BFG makes her a new dress out of her blanket to replace her heavily soiled nightgown and treats her to a delicious and remarkable drink called "frobscottle".

The next morning, the BFG takes Sophie to Dream Country to catch more dreams. In Dream Country, the BFG demonstrates his dream-catching skills to Sophie and teaches her to fly; but the BFG mistakenly captures a "trogglehumper", the worst kind of nightmare. Upon arriving at his Dream Cave, the BFG shows Sophie all the dreams he has captured already and locks away the nightmare in his cavern of lava in a tiny chest, and takes Sophie to watch him on his dream-blowing duties; but this is cut short when they spot the Fleshlumpeater (the biggest and worst of the evil giants) devouring a little boy whom the BFG had previously given a pleasant dream. The BFG flees with her to prevent her from being in danger again.

Afterwards, the grief-stricken Sophie convinces the BFG to stop the evil giants. They develop a plan to expose the evil giants to the Queen of England. Using dreams from his collection, the BFG creates a nightmare, blows it into the Queen's bedroom, leaves Sophie on the Queen's windowsill to confirm the dream and retreats into the palace gardens when Sophie calls him. Because the dream included foreknowledge of Sophie's presence, the Queen believes her story, and speaks with the BFG. The British Army and Air-Force follow the BFG to Giant Country where the giants are tethered and taken prisoner. However, the Fleshlumpeater is the only one to evade capture. He furiously confronts and attacks the BFG for his betrayal and then goes after Sophie but, with the help of the terrible nightmare he caught earlier, the BFG is able to subdue the Fleshlumpeater, who is captured as well.

All nine of the evil giants are then all transported via helicopters to London, where they are imprisoned in a deep metal pit and forced to eat snozzcumbers for the rest of their lives. Contrary to the book's ending, the BFG stays in Giant Country instead of moving to England, and Sophie becomes his assistant at the distribution of dreams.

Voice cast
 David Jason as the BFG
 Amanda Root as Sophie
 Angela Thorne as The Queen
 Don Henderson as the Bloodbottler / the Fleshlumpeater / the Sergeant
 Frank Thornton as Mr. Tibbs
 Mollie Sugden as Mary
 Michael Knowles as the Head of the Air Force
 Ballard Berkeley as the Head of the Army
 Myfanwy Talog as Mrs. Clonkers
 Jimmy Hibbert as Additional Voices

Production
The BFG was one of Cosgrove Hall Films' only feature-length films, which was directed by Brian Cosgrove, along with The Wind in the Willows. Cosgrove also produced the film along with Mark Hall, while John Hambley, who also executive produced the film, scripted the film after Brian Trueman's initial draft was rejected.

Development of the film can be traced as far back as 1984, when only 5 people, including Cosgrove, were working on the film before being joined by other crew members.

According to Brian Cosgrove, the director and producer of the film, Roald Dahl was very supportive to the studio in production.

During production of the film, which took over 3 years, 750,000 cels were used against watercolour backgrounds designed by a team led by DC Thomson cartoonist John Geering.

The film also used the rotoscoping technique for some of the characters, particularly for Queen Elizabeth II and her servants. Initially, the technique was used while animating Sophie, but it was soon discovered that Jean Flynn and Meryl Edge could animate Sophie's movements without a reference.

Reception

Writing in The Sunday Times before its broadcast, Patrick Stoddart called it a "delight", and wrote that it "puts its already celebrated British animators, Cosgrove Hall, into the Disney class". It has since gone on to be a cult classic.

In 2016, Louisa Mellor, of the Den of Geek website, warmly appraised the film in comparison to Steven Spielberg's then just-released adaptation, saying, "Cosgrove Hall's twenty-seven year old animated feature may be less of a technical feat than the latter and was certainly made for a fraction of the budget, but that doesn't make it any less a whoppsy-whiffling, razztwizzling tribute to a terrific story."

Roald Dahl's reaction
This film was the only adaptation of Dahl's works released during his lifetime to get praise from the author himself. Cosgrove said that after Dahl sat through a screening of the film, he stood up and applauded in delight.

Media releases
The film was first released on VHS by Video Collection International in the United Kingdom on 17 September 1990, in collaboration with Thorn EMI's Thames Video Collection. It was released again by the same company on 25 September 1995 and 13 October 1997.

Roadshow Home Video and ABC Video released the film on VHS in Australia on 12 February 1992, while its first video release in the United States was by Celebrity Home Entertainment on 2 April 1996.

Pearson Television International Ltd re-released the film on VHS on 2 July 2001, and on DVD for the first time on 8 April 2002. The DVD features 3 interactive games, an interview with Brian Cosgrove, a photo gallery and storyboards. Another release followed on 1 January 2008 by Pearson's successor, Fremantle Home Entertainment.

The film's first DVD release in the United States was distributed by Celebrity Home Entertainment on 28 September 1999. It was re-released by A&E Home Video on 27 June 2006.

On 10 September 2012, Fremantle Home Entertainment released a remastered version of the film on DVD and Blu-ray Disc.

On 11 July 2016, the film was re-released on DVD and Blu-ray Disc, but by Universal Pictures Home Entertainment in the United Kingdom.

Soundtrack

Keith Hopwood's and Malcolm Rowe's original score to The BFG was released on 11 July 2016 by Pluto Music Limited and FremantleMedia.

Track listing

Accolades

See also
 The BFG, the 2016 Disney live action feature

References

External links
 

1989 films
1989 animated films
1980s children's animated films
Animated films about friendship
Animated films about orphans
Animated films based on children's books
Animated films set in London
British children's animated films
Cosgrove Hall Films films
Films based on works by Roald Dahl
Films about giants
Nelvana films
Cultural depictions of Elizabeth II
British children's films
Films about dreams
Films directed by Brian Cosgrove
Films scored by Keith Hopwood
Rotoscoped films
1980s English-language films
1980s British films